Fresno Football Club was an American professional soccer team based in Fresno, California. Founded in 2017, the team was a member of the USL Championship, a second-tier league in the American Soccer Pyramid. Their first game took place on March 17, 2018. The team folded on October 29, 2019, after the ownership group was unable to secure construction of a soccer-specific stadium. On December 19, 2019, team ownership announced that it was searching for a new location in California for the 2021 USL Championship season. On February 1, 2021, the team's franchise rights were transferred to Monterey Bay FC, an expansion USL Championship team based in Monterey County, California.

Colors and logo
The team colors were sky blue, San Joaquin navy blue, Fuego red. The logo of the team included the initials "AM", a memorial to the deceased wife of an investor. FFC chose the Fox as their mascot and secondary logo on November 7, 2017. The team was also referred to as The Foxes or Los Zorros in Spanish.

Sponsorship

Year-by-year

References

External links
 

 
2017 establishments in California
Association football clubs established in 2017
Association football clubs disestablished in 2019
Sports in Fresno, California
Former USL Championship teams
Soccer clubs in California